Frank Hamilton Lacey TD, FRCOG, (1879–1958) was an Irish surgeon and foundation fellow of the Royal College of Obstetricians and Gynaecologists.

Early life and education
He was born 2 May 1879 in Dublin. His father was a physician; his mother was a direct descendant of Bennet Langton, and passed down letters and memorabilia from Samuel Johnson to her son. He graduated MB ChB  from the University of Manchester (1906) and M.D. (1912).  He then took up a position at Saint Mary's Hospital, Manchester.

Military service
During World War I, he served with the Royal Army Service Corps in Egypt and the Dardanelles,  and then served with the Royal Army Medical Corps in France.  He retired as a major, and received the Territorial Decoration.

Later life
After the war he was honorary surgeon at Saint Mary's Hospital, Manchester.  He also was honorary gynaecologist to the Christie Hospital. He became a clinical lecturer in obstetrics and gynaecology at the University of Manchester.

He died at his home in Balcombe in 1958, survived by his wife Evelyn Rudge Lacey and their three children.

References

External links
 https://obgyn.onlinelibrary.wiley.com/doi/abs/10.1111/j.1471-0528.1958.tb08575.x

1879 births
1958 deaths
Fellows of the Royal College of Obstetricians and Gynaecologists
20th-century Irish medical doctors
Irish surgeons
Royal Army Medical Corps officers
British Army personnel of World War I
20th-century surgeons

Alumni of the University of Manchester
Medical doctors from Dublin (city)